Pudagla is a municipality in the Vorpommern-Greifswald district, in Mecklenburg-Vorpommern, Germany.

Geography and Transport 
Pudagla is located between the Achterwasser lagoon about 1500 metres to the west, the Schmollensee lake directly to the southeast and the coast of the Baltic Sea approximately 5 kilometres to the northeast. The village is situated at the foot of Glaubensberg Hill (38,8 m above sea level) and since the new layout of the Bundesstraße 111 in January 2008, directly on the transport route. This runs right through the Usedom Island Nature Park. Approximately 15 kilometres to the southwest is the town of Usedom and about six kilometres to the east are the Kaiserbäder resorts  Bansin, Heringsdorf and Ahlbeck. The abandoned village of Camik and the settlement of Stoben Sheep Farm are also part of the village.

History 

The first documented mention of Pudagla was in the year 1270 as "Pudgla", also written as "Putglow". This is a transliteration of the slavic pad glowe (at the hill) and is related to present-day Glaubensberg south of the village at Schmollensee. The name of this hill is derived from "glowa“ - (plattdeutsch "Glaube").

Duke Barnim I of Pomerania gifted the village Pudagla with its tithes and all rights including to the river Pritolniza, known today as Groote Beek  to Usedom Abbey on 14 October 1273.

From 1307/09 until the Protestant Reformation, it was the site of Pudagla or Usedom Abbey, which moved there from Usedom (town) (Grobe Abbey). After the abbey's secularization into a ducal domain, it at times served as an administrative center. Historical buildings are the former monastery church, some further ruins of the abbey, and a palace.

References

Vorpommern-Greifswald